Suzanne Grossmann (December 21, 1937 – August 19, 2010) was a Swiss-American actress, playwright and television writer, born in Basel, Switzerland.  She later lived and studied in Brazil, Canada, and the USA. Having first obtained her Bachelor of Arts degree at McGill University, in Montreal, Quebec, Ms Grossmann was among the first graduates of the National Theatre School of Canada in 1963.

Ms. Grossmann made her Broadway debut in James Goldman's The Lion in Winter, playing Alais. In 1968 she was Roxane to Robert Symonds' Cyrano in a revival of Cyrano de Bergerac. A revival of George Kelly's The Show-Off, starring Helen Hayes, followed later that year, and, in 1970, she played Sybil Chase in Private Lives opposite the Elyot and Amanda of Brian Bedford and Tammy Grimes.

Soon after, she turned her talents to writing for stage and television. With Paxton Whitehead, a fellow actor, she translated and adapted Georges Feydeau's farce There's One in Every Marriage for the Broadway stage in 1971, followed by Feydeau's Chemin de Fer. As a screenwriter for television, she wrote more than 100 episodes for the popular, long-running television soap opera Ryan's Hope.

References

External links

Variety obituary, August 24, 2010, Stage Actress, scribe Grossmann dies
LA Times obituary, August 25, 2010

1937 births
2010 deaths
American stage actresses
American soap opera actresses
American television writers
National Theatre School of Canada alumni
Actors from Basel-Stadt
Swiss emigrants to the United States
20th-century American dramatists and playwrights
American women television writers
20th-century American actresses
21st-century American women